Božidar Ðorđević (born 12 April 1959) is a Yugoslav rower. He competed in the men's coxed four event at the 1980 Summer Olympics.

References

1959 births
Living people
Yugoslav male rowers
Olympic rowers of Yugoslavia
Rowers at the 1980 Summer Olympics
Place of birth missing (living people)